Ivor is an English masculine given name derived either directly from the Norse Ívarr, or from Welsh (which spells it Ifor), Irish (sometimes Ibar), or Scottish, all of which likely derive it also from the original Norse form. The Norse name is derived from the Old Norse elements ýr (yew, bow) and herr (warrior, army): hence, 'archer, bow warrior'. It is possible the old Norse name Ívarr comes from the Celtic root and may be related to the Celtic root of -iv which is found in St. Ives for example, itself possibly referring to yew. This could indicate an earlier shared language origin; potentially through Indo-European, previous contact or another source.

Some of the earliest known bearers of the name are Ibar of Beggerin, an Irish saint who may have preceded or been contemporary with St. Patrick and probably died in the 500s; Ivar the Boneless, an 800s Viking who was possibly identical to the Ímair attested in Irish and Scottish annals; and Ifor Bach, a Welsh leader of the 1100s.

People

Religious
Íbar of Killibar Beg, an early Irish saint. Unknown if related to Ibar of Beggerin.

Academics
Ivor Agyeman-Duah (born 1966), Ghanaian academic, economist and writer
 Ivor Grattan-Guinness, British historian of mathematics and logic
Ivor van Heerden, South African-born American meteorologist
Ivor G. Wilks (1928–2014), British Africanist and historian

Arts and entertainment
 Ivor Barnard (1887–1953), English actor
 Ivor Casey (born 1983), Irish writer
 Ivor Cutler (1923–2006), Scottish poet, songwriter and humorist
 Iva Davies, lead singer of Icehouse
 Ivor Davies (artist) (born 1935), Welsh painter
 Ivor Darreg (1917–1994),  American composer
 Ivor Dean (1917–1974), British actor
 Ivor Dennis (1932-2018), Sri Lankan Sinhala playback vocalist
 Ivor Emmanuel (1927–2007), British opera singer
 Ivor Francis (1918–1986), Canadian-born American actor
 Ivor Gurney (1890–1937), English composer and poet
 Ivor Hele (1912–1993), Australian painter
 Ivor James (1882–1963), British cellist
 Ivor Mairants (1908–1998), British-Polish guitarist
 Ivor Moreton (1908–1984), British singer and pianist
 Ivor Novello (1893–1951), Welsh entertainer
 Ivor Roberts (actor) (1925–1999), British actor and television presenter
 Ivor Wood (1932–2004), British stop-motion animator
 Ivor Biggun, stage name of British musician Doc Cox

Nobility
 Lord Ivor Spencer-Churchill (1898–1956), British art collector

Politicians and diplomats
 Ivor Callely (born 1958), Irish politician
 Ivor Caplin (born 1958), British politician
 Ivor Guest, 1st Viscount Wimborne (1873–1939), British politician
 Ivor Guest, 1st Baron Wimborne (1835–1914), Welsh industrialist, father of the above
 Ivor Richard, Baron Richard (1932-2018), British politician
 Ivor Roberts (diplomat) (born 1946), British diplomat

Sportsmen
 Ivor Allchurch (1929–1997), Wales international footballer
 Ivan Ivor Broadis (1922–2019), England international footballer
 Ivor Bueb (1923–1959), British Formula One driver
 Ivor Jones (1901–1982), Welsh rugby union player
 Ivor McIvor (1917–1997), Australian rules footballer and captain-coach.

Fictional characters
 the title character of Ivor the Engine, an animated British TV series
 one of the characters in the Who song "A Quick One, While He's Away"
 one of the title characters of Ivor Lott and Tony Broke, a British comic strip
 a main character in the video game Minecraft Story Mode
 a character in the comedy duo act Damo and Ivor

References

Masculine given names